Fulton Township is located in Whiteside County, Illinois, United States. As of the 2010 census, its population was 4,251 and it contained 2,032 housing units.

Geography

Demographics

References

External links
City-data.com
Whiteside County Official Site

Townships in Whiteside County, Illinois
Townships in Illinois